Doropo Department is a department of Bounkani Region in Zanzan District, Ivory Coast. In 2021, its population was 93,386 and its seat is the settlement of Doropo. The sub-prefectures of the department are Danoa, Doropo, Kalamon, and Niamoué.

History
Doropo Department was created in 2011 as part of the restructuring of the subdivisions of Ivory Coast, when departments were converted from the second-level administrative subdivisions of the country to the third-level subdivisions. It and Téhini Department were created by splitting Bouna Department into three departments and a fourth area in Comoé National Park that is not governed by a department.

Notes

Departments of Bounkani
States and territories established in 2011
2011 establishments in Ivory Coast